Sicasal–Acral was a Portuguese professional road cycling team that existed from 1986 until 1995. The team competed in eight editions of the Vuelta a España, as well as the 1995 Giro d'Italia. This made the team the first and only Portuguese team so far ride in the Giro d'Italia.

References

Cycling teams based in Portugal
Defunct cycling teams based in Portugal
1986 establishments in Portugal
Cycling teams established in 1986
Cycling teams disestablished in 1995